Billy Billett (21 May 1888 – 28 January 1956) was an Australian rules footballer who played with Fitzroy and South Melbourne in the Victorian Football League (VFL).

Notes

External links 
		

1888 births
1956 deaths
Australian rules footballers from Victoria (Australia)
Fitzroy Football Club players
Sydney Swans players